Kevin Bilal Duckett (born January 9, 1989) is an American soccer player.

Career

College and amateur
Duckett  played youth soccer in Georgia and played for  McIntosh High School where he captained the squad to a state title in his senior season. Duckett joined the Notre Dame Fighting Irish in 2007 and was the starting right back during his last two years with the school.

Professional
Duckett was drafted first in the third round (37th overall) in the 2011 MLS SuperDraft by Vancouver Whitecaps FC. His versatility impressed coach Teitur Thordarson, who used Duckett, a natural right back, at center back and left back during the 2011 pre-season. The club signed Duckett on March 15, 2011, and he made his professional debut on June 1 in a game against Chivas USA.

Duckett was waived by Vancouver on November 23, 2011.

Duckett signed with USL Pro team Harrisburg City Islanders on March 27, 2012.

Duckett signed with the MLS team New England Revolution on February 11, 2013.

On February 20, 2014 Duckett signed with USL Pro club Charlotte Eagles.

After the Eagles moved to the USL PDL, Duckett signed with USL side Sacramento Republic, before again moving to Charlotte Independence soon after on April 10, 2015. Duckett left Charlotte after their 2018 season.

References

External links
 
 Notre Dame player profile

1989 births
Living people
American soccer players
American expatriate soccer players
Notre Dame Fighting Irish men's soccer players
Atlanta Silverbacks U23's players
Indiana Invaders players
Vancouver Whitecaps FC players
Vancouver Whitecaps FC U-23 players
Penn FC players
New England Revolution players
Rochester New York FC players
Charlotte Eagles players
Sacramento Republic FC players
Charlotte Independence players
Expatriate soccer players in Canada
Vancouver Whitecaps FC draft picks
USL League Two players
Major League Soccer players
USL Championship players
Soccer players from Georgia (U.S. state)
Sportspeople from Macon, Georgia
Association football defenders